In the Sumerian mythological poem Lugal-e, Asag or Azag, is a monstrous demon, so hideous that his presence alone makes fish boil alive in the rivers. 

He was said to be accompanied into battle by an army of rock demon offspring—born of his union with the mountains themselves. 

He was vanquished by the heroic Akkadian deity Ninurta, using Sharur, his enchanted talking mace, after seeking the counsel of his father, the god Enlil.

References

External links
 Ninurta defeats the Asag—ETCSL tablet translation

Mesopotamian demons